The 2017 Charlotte Hounds season was the sixth season for the Charlotte Hounds of Major League Lacrosse. The Hounds came in trying to improve upon their 8-6 record in 2016, when they earned their second playoff berth in franchise history but lost to the Ohio Machine in the semifinals, 16-10. This was head coach's Jim Stagnitta's second season in charge, after leading the Hounds to their first ever winning season in 2016.

The Hounds remaining in the playoff hunt entering the final week of the regular season needing a win and a loss by Rochester. The Hounds got neither, as they finished the season 6-8 and seventh in the standings.

Schedule

Regular season

Standings

References

External links
 Team Website 

Major League Lacrosse seasons
Charlotte Hounds